Joseph Jonathan Davis (April 13, 1828 – August 7, 1892) was an American lawyer and judge who represented his native North Carolina's 4th congressional district from 1875 to 1881.

Biography
Born near the small North Carolina town of Louisburg, Davis attended Louisburg Academy, Wake Forest College and the College of William and Mary. He graduated from the law department of the University of North Carolina at Chapel Hill in 1850 and was admitted to the bar the same year, commencing practice in Oxford, North Carolina and later Louisburg, North Carolina. During the Civil War, he served as captain of Company G in the 47th North Carolina Infantry Regiment in the Confederate Army.

Davis was a member of the North Carolina House of Representatives from 1868 to 1870 and was elected a Democrat to the United States House of Representatives in 1874, serving from 1875 to 1881. Afterwards, he resumed practicing law, was appointed an associate justice in the North Carolina Supreme Court in 1887 and was elected to the position in 1888. He died in Louisburg at the age of 64 and was interred in the town's Oaklawn Cemetery.

External links

References

1828 births
1892 deaths
Louisburg College alumni
Democratic Party members of the North Carolina House of Representatives
Justices of the North Carolina Supreme Court
North Carolina lawyers
Confederate States Army officers
Wake Forest University alumni
College of William & Mary alumni
University of North Carolina at Chapel Hill alumni
People of North Carolina in the American Civil War
People from Louisburg, North Carolina
Democratic Party members of the United States House of Representatives from North Carolina
19th-century American politicians